In many sports, a competition number is used to identify and differentiate the competitors taking part in a competitive endeavour. For example, runners in a race may wear prominent competition numbers so that they may be clearly identified from a distance.  Competition numbers are differentiated from uniform numbers in that the former are used for a specific event (for example, competition numbers worn by marathon runners) while the latter persist over time through multiple events, seasons, or sometimes an entire career (for example, uniform numbers worn by Major League Baseball players).

Competition numbers may also be called bib numbers when worn on bibs over, or affixed to, the athletes' tops. With new technology, bibs might contain timing chips for electronic identification. In addition to identifying an athlete, many high profile events also imprint sponsor logos. In such high profile events, bib numbers are mandatory. Failure to wear them could make an athlete subject to disqualification.

Athletics
Since the 2000s, track and field athletes at major competitions wear their names as well as their numbers on their bibs. In relay events, all team members have the IOC country code.  Track athletes also wear lane numbers on the shorts called "hip numbers", for identification by the fully automatic timing system which photographs athletes from the side as they cross a finish line.  In racewalking events, competitors also must wear numbers on their backs for identification by the judges after a violation has been detected.

In mixed competitions, like marathons, where professional athletes run on the same course as non-elite athletes, the professionals traditionally wear bibs with their names to differentiate their pre-race status.

Gallery

Motorsport
In some types of motorsport, such as rallys, competition numbers are attached to the vehicles taking part in a specific event. The competition number can also be used in conjunction with some kinds of timing systems, such as targa timing.

Gallery

Other sports
Other sports that may utilize competition numbers  include:
 Alpine skiing
 Biathlon
 BMX racing
 Gymnastics
 Snowboarding
 Triathlon

Gallery

Notable competition numbers
While the uniform numbers of various sportspeople have become well-known (for example, Wayne Gretzky's 99, Michael Jordan's 23, and Mickey Mantle's 7), this is rare for competition numbers, which generally are used by an athlete only for a single event. Some notable exceptions include:

 6 used by Paul Bikle, a gliding competitor. The Bikle T-6, a glider, was named for Bikle's competition number and the T-tailed design of the aircraft.
 13 in cycling, which is commonly worn upside-down due to triskaidekaphobia.
 51 in the Tour de France, due to a false belief that it has been worn by more winners than any other number.
 261 in the Boston Marathon, due to it being worn by Kathrine Switzer in the 1967 edition of the event, when she became the first woman to run the race as a numbered entrant. Switzer later created a non-profit organization named 261 Fearless.

At the 2019 Boston Marathon, organizers gave special bib numbers to several celebrities. Former NFL player Tedy Bruschi was given 5454, his uniform number repeated; NASCAR driver Jimmie Johnson was given 4848, his car number with Hendrick Motorsports repeated; and Joan Benoit Samuelson was given 1979, the year of her first win in the event.

See also
Number (sports)
Name (sports)

References

Further reading

External links
 Thousands Of Runners Grab Bib Numbers, Gear At Boston Marathon Expo from CBS Boston via YouTube
 Triathlon Race Day Tips | Race Belt and Race Number via YouTube